Pluciński (feminine: Plucińska; plural: Plucińscy) is a Polish surname. Notable people with the surname include:

 Andrzej Pluciński (1915–1963), Polish basketball player
 Bolesław Kamil Pluciński (1854–1932), Polish-French actor known professionally as Armand Dutertre
 Leszek Pluciński (born 1990), Polish cyclist
 Tadeusz Pluciński (born 1926), Polish actor

See also
 

Polish-language surnames